"Boombayah" is a song by South Korean girl group Blackpink. It was released coupled with "Whistle" in the group's digital debut single album titled Square One, on August 8, 2016, by YG Entertainment. "Boombayah" peaked at number 7 in South Korea and topped the Billboard World Digital Song Sales chart in the first week of sales. On October 13, 2020, "Boombayah" became the first K-pop debut music video to surpass 1 billion views on YouTube.

Background and release 
"Boombayah" was released on August 8, 2016, at 8 p.m. KST (UTC+09:00) as a digital single titled Square One, coupled with "Whistle", through various digital music portals in South Korea.

Reception 
The song received generally positive reviews from music critics. Jeff Benjamin of Billboard K-Town said that Blackpink "embraces the hip-hop sensibilities and club-ready sounds with which their seniors gained an international following", referring to their labelmates Psy, Big Bang and 2NE1, with the song's "booming" and "exotic beats".

Commercially, "Boombayah" debuted at number 7 on the South Korean Gaon Digital Chart, selling 88,215 digital units and garnering 1,866,737 streams in the country. In the United States, "Boombayah" topped the Billboard World Digital Song Sales chart for the week of August 27, 2016. The following week, "Whistle" descended to number 3 on the chart.

The track reached 12.7 million streams in the United Kingdom as of April 2019, and 23.4 million streams as of September 2022, becoming the group's fifth most streamed song in the country.

Music video and promotion
The music video for "Boombayah" was directed by Seo Hyun-seung, who had previously directed the music videos for "I Am the Best" by 2NE1 and "Fantastic Baby" by Big Bang. The video was released on Blackpink's official YouTube channel on August 8, 2016. As of December 2022, the video has surpassed 1.5 billion views.

Blackpink promoted "Boombayah" at their debut stage on SBS's Inkigayo on August 14, 2016. They subsequently promoted the song for the two following weeks on Inkigayo, and also performed "Boombayah" at the 26th Seoul Music Awards on January 19, 2017.

Usage in media
The song was featured in the Netflix television series Wu Assassins during a fight scene in "Drunken Watermelon", the first episode of the first season.

The song is featured on the dance rhythm game Just Dance 2022, which uses a modified version of the official choreography.

Credits and personnel
Credits adapted from Melon.
 Blackpink primary vocals
 Teddy Park composer, lyricist, arranger
 Bekuh Boom composer, lyricist

Chart performance

Weekly charts

Monthly charts

Year-end charts

Certifications

Release history

References 

Blackpink songs
2016 debut singles
YG Entertainment singles
2016 songs
Songs written by Teddy Park